USS Chatterer is a name used more than once by the U.S. Navy:

 , a coastal minesweeper placed in service on 20 November 1940.
 , a minesweeper commissioned as USS YMS-415, 1 October 1944.

References 

United States Navy ship names